Potito may refer to:

Potito (singer), a Spanish flamenco singer
Potito Starace (born 1981), an Italian professional tennis player 
San Potito Ultra - town and comune in the province of Avellino, Campania, Italy 
San Potito Sannitico, a comune in the Province of Caserta, Campania, Italy 
San Potito (disambiguation)